COmputer STored Ambulatory Record (COSTAR) is an electronic medical record using the MUMPS programming language.  It was developed by the Laboratory of Computer Science at Massachusetts General Hospital between 1968 and 1971 for Harvard Community Health Plan by Octo Barnett and Jerome Grossman.

References
Hattwick, Michael A. W. Computer Stored Ambulatory Record Systems in Real Life Practice. Proc Annu Symp Comput Appl Med Care. 1979 October 17; 761–764.
Barnett, G. Octo. Computer-stored ambulatory record (COSTAR). 1976.
Agency for Healthcare Research and Quality (AHRQ). Medical Informatics for Better and Safer Health Care. Research in Action, Issue 6. June 2002
Kerlin, Barbara D (1986). Dissemination of COSTAR: Promises and Realities. Journal of Medical Systems  
Clinfowiki - COmputer STored Ambulatory Record (COSTAR)

Electronic health record software
Massachusetts General Hospital